The Board of County Commissioners (BCC) is the governing body of Orange County, Florida.  It runs in the manner of a county commission.  It has six seats held by elected officials called "County Commissioners", each commissioner in charge of their own District, led by a separate mayor of Orange County.

Current Board

Mayor
The current mayor of Orange County is Jerry Demings (D).

County commissioners
District 1 Nicole Wilson (D)
District 2 Christine Moore (R)
District 3 Mayra Uribe (D)
District 4 Maribel Gomez Cordero (D)
District 5 Emily Bonilla (D)
District 6 Michael "Mike" Scott (D)

2006 board election
The mayor and commissioners each hold four-year terms, and are limited to two full terms each.  The mayor and the commissioners of the even-numbered districts are up for election during mid-term election cycles, while the commissioners of the odd-numbered districts are up for election during presidential election cycles.  Elections are non-partisan, but partisan politics do tend to play a role in the elections.  The elections are contested during the September primary election.  If a single candidate fails to get a simple majority of votes for their seat, then the top two candidates will face each other in a run-off election during the November general election.

An election was held on September 5, 2006. Richard Crotty took over the position of Mayor of Orange County during Mel Martinez's 1998 term (Martinez was selected as George W. Bush's secretary of housing and urban development), so he is still eligible for re-election in 2006.  Both Bob Sindler and Homer Hartage were term-limited out, with Hartage running for Democratic nomination to Florida's 8th congressional district, which he lost to Charlie Stuart.  Sindler, also a Democrat, was running for the 38th District of the Florida House of Representatives, but was disqualified from campaigning for the seat due to failure to adhere to resign to run rules.  Not coincidentally, the man that won District 2 in the primary, Fred Brummer, a Republican, was term-limited out of the same seat Sindler considered running for, and so essentially ran as an incumbent.

Richard Crotty won the election for Mayor of Orange County, with 69.69% of the vote. Sally Baptiste was his only opponent.

Fred Brummer, previously representing the overlapping 38th District in the Florida House of Representatives, won District 2 with 53.61% of the vote.  Lawrence Kolin was second, with 20.23% of the vote.  Two others ran for the seat.

Linda Stewart successfully defended her seat, winning a second term for District 4 with 51.46% of the vote.  Jennifer Thompson was second, with 31.45% of the vote.  Two others ran for the seat.

The race for District 6 was hotly contested, and ended in a virtual dead heat in the primary, with Tiffany Moore and Bruce Antone getting 37.92% and 37.46% of the vote, respectively.  E.Juan Lynum, the son of Orlando city commissioner Daisy Lynum, was third in a field of five. Tiffany Moore ultimately won the election at the General Election, defeating Bruce Antone by a 53%-47% margin.

2008 board elections
In District 1, where Teresa Jacobs could not run again due to term limits, S. Scott Boyd and Sharon Gravitte finished in a near dead heat, 35.31% to 33.81% respectively, in the 2008-08-26, primary election.  In a runoff held during the general election on November 4, Boyd won the election with 55% of the vote.

In District 3, Mildred Fernandez successfully defended her seat in a one-on-one election between her and challenger John Kelly Harris in the general election on November 4.  She received 56.75% of the vote.

In District 5, Bill Segal ran unopposed, and retained his seat

2014 board elections
In District 2, incumbent commissioner Fred Brummer of Apopka was term-limited out of office. State representative Bryan Nelson came with one percent of the vote to avoid a November runoff election as he finished first in the six-way primary with 49% of the vote. Eatonville vice-mayor finished in second place and advanced to the runoff with 18% of the vote, finishing a few hundred votes ahead of corrections officer Patricia Rumph, who finished third. Two other candidates, Prince Brown and Greg Jackson finished with a combined 15% of the vote.

In District 4, incumbent Jennifer Thompson ran for re-election with opposition from union representative Euri Cerrud and homemaker Maribel Cordero. She easily beat out both, winning outright with 65% of the vote.

In District 6, incumbent commissioner Tiffany Moore Russell was term-limited and entered the race for the Orange County clerk of courts. Businessman Derrick "Shine" Wallace and lawyer and husband of Gary Siplin, Victoria Siplin emerged from the primary with 21% and 28% of the vote respectively. They will both take part in the November runoff. Other candidates receiving votes were former Moore Russell aide Roberta Walton, Virginia Whittington, former Orange County commissioner Homer Hartage and community activist Luwanna Gelzer.

See also
Teresa Jacobs
Mayor of Orange County
Orange County, Florida

References

External links
 Orange County Board of County Commissioners Official Website
 Orange County Supervisor of Elections Results for September 5, 2006, Primary

County government in Florida
Orange County, Florida